Warren Kenneth Worthington III (originally known as Angel and later as Archangel) is a superhero appearing in American comic books published by Marvel Comics. Created by writer Stan Lee and artist Jack Kirby, the character first appeared in The X-Men #1 (September 1963). Angel is a founding member of the X-Men. 

Angel is a mutant, an evolved species of humans who are born with superhuman abilities. The character originally possesses a pair of large feathered wings extending from his back, enabling him to fly. He is the heir of the Worthington family fortune, and this privileged background results in Warren being stereotyped as self-absorbed and unable to deal with hardships during his early years with the X-Men. This personality was ultimately replaced with a more introspective and brooding personality in the late 1980s, when the character was changed into the darker "Archangel" persona. While Angel's wings were originally feathered, his transition to Archangel resulted in metallic wings and newfound powers.

As one of the original X-Men, Archangel has had a frequent presence in X-Men-related comic books throughout the years and also appeared occasionally in X-Men animated series and video games. Ben Foster played the role of Angel in the 2006 film X-Men: The Last Stand and Ben Hardy portrayed a younger version in the 2016 film X-Men: Apocalypse.

Publication history 
The character was created by writer Stan Lee and artist/co-creator Jack Kirby and first appeared in X-Men #1 (Sept. 1963) as Angel. Lee made Angel rich and conceited, as well as a winged human to make him the first Marvel character with wings. He appeared as a regular character in that title until it was cancelled with issue #66. The title was revived shortly after, reprinting earlier issues from issue #67 to #93. In 1970 and 1971, a three-part Angel solo feature was published as a back-up strip in Ka-Zar #2 and #3 and Marvel Tales #30.

Angel appeared in the X-Men revamp by Len Wein and Dave Cockrum in 1975 with the introduction of the "All-New, All-Different X-Men" (Giant-Size X-Men #1 May 1975), but left the X-Men title with issue #94. Angel and fellow X-Man Iceman were transitioned into a new series called The Champions, which ran from 1975 to 1978. Series creator Tony Isabella had wanted to do a series about Angel and Iceman traveling together on the highway, in the vein of Route 66, but the editors told him to make it into a full team book.

Angel returned to the X-Men briefly in The Uncanny X-Men #134, officially returning to the roster in issue #138 before once again leaving in issue #148. Afterwards, the character, along with fellow founding X-Men Beast and Iceman, joined the roster of The Defenders, as part of a short-lived "revamp" of the title, in which the series was renamed The New Defenders. Angel would stay with the title, as the group's leader, for the book's last three years of publication (1983–1986). The series was canceled in 1986 to free up Angel and his fellow X-Men to star in X-Factor, which debuted in February. Angel remained in the book until issue #70, which was the last issue before the book was revamped with an all-new roster. During X-Factor #16–24, the character is presumed dead after losing his wings and apparently killing himself in a plane crash. Angel was dramatically revamped as a character, given a new costume, blue skin, and metallic wings which could fire blades. He first appeared as Archangel in X-Factor #24 (Jan. 1988). According to X-Factor writer Louise Simonson and penciler Walt Simonson, the Archangel revamp was motivated in part by their feeling that Angel was a Mary Sue (being wealthy, handsome, and adored by women), and in part by the fact that, due to the inflation of superhero abilities, Angel was underpowered compared to other characters in the Marvel Universe.

Angel was added to the cast of Uncanny X-Men title and appeared in that series and its companion series X-Men for most of the 1990s. In 1996, Marvel also published a one-shot story simply called Archangel, which was written by Peter Milligan. He also appeared alongside Psylocke in a limited series called Psylocke & Archangel: Crimson Dawn (August 1997 – November 1997, 4 issues). From 1999 to 2001, Angel also featured in the series X-Men: The Hidden Years, which was set in the original X-Men's early days.

Under Joe Casey (2001–2002) and Chuck Austen (2002–2004), Angel became leader of the X-Men team that appeared in the pages of Uncanny X-Men. After Chris Claremont replaced Austen on that title, the character went away for several months before reappearing in the pages of another Claremont-written series, Excalibur (vol. 3 2004). He continued to guest-star in the Incredible Hulk title during the events of World War Hulk (2007) and then returned to Uncanny X-Men (2008-2011) while simultaneously appearing in X-Force (vol. 3) (2008-2010), where the character regained his metallic wings and again assumed the codename Archangel, and subsequently in Uncanny X-Force (2010-2011), in which his mind and personality were wiped.

After his personality was stripped, he appeared in a supporting role as one of the students at the Jean Grey School in Wolverine and the X-Men (2011–2013). He later joined Magneto's more militant X-Men team in Uncanny X-Men (2016-2017) and an international strike force in Astonishing X-Men (2017-2018) after his memory was restored. At the same time, a time-displaced version of Angel's younger self was brought to the present and starred in All-New X-Men (2012–2017) and X-Men Blue (2017-2018), before being returned to his correct time-period in the mini-series Extermination (2018).

Angel appeared in House of X and Powers of X (2019), which detailed the birth of the Krakoan Age. He was made the CXO of Krakoa's new X-Corp and appeared in the mini-series Empyre: X-Men (2020) and X-Corp (2021).

Fictional character biography

Angel 
Warren Worthington was born in Centerport, New York, to Kathryn Worthington and Warren Worthington Jr. He attends Phillips Exeter Academy in his adolescence when his feathered wings begin to grow from his shoulder blades. At first, Warren feels he is a freak and aberration, but he soon learns that he can use his wings to fly and help people. When there is a fire in his dormitory, he borrows some props from the school's drama department, dresses up as a heavenly angel, and rescues his friends. He soon learns that he is in fact a mutant. He dons a mask and costume, calls himself the  Avenging Angel, and becomes a solo adventurer, before being recruited by Professor Charles Xavier for the X-Men.

Warren's status as a wealthy playboy, as well as being an outspoken individual who chafes at the notion of being told what to do, is the subject of much tension within the X-Men. In particular, Warren is in love with Jean Grey, who is in love with Scott Summers, although he ultimately sets aside his love for Jean, coming to terms with the fact that Jean loves Scott. Angel still harbors an unrequited love for Jean even as he begins dating Candy Southern.

While pursuing Sauron in the Savage Land, Angel is attacked by pteranodons and falls to his death. He would have remained dead if not for the "Creator", who is Magneto without his costume. Magneto provides the necessary medical treatment needed to revive Angel and provides him with a new blue-and-white costume. Unknown to Angel, the costume also has a device installed that lets Magneto gain control over Angel, which he does months later when he makes an attack on the X-Men.

Around this time, Angel publicly reveals himself as a mutant after discovering that not only has his uncle, Burt Worthington (who goes by the name of the Dazzler — though he is in no way related to Alison Blaire, a later mutant heroine and brief love interest for Warren in her own comic series who also uses the name), murdered Warren's father, Warren Worthington, Jr., but also poisoned his mother in order to ensure his inheritance of the Worthington fortune.

When the original X-Men are captured by the mutant island Krakoa, Professor X creates a new team of X-Men to rescue them. When this new team decides to stay on as X-Men, Angel and the rest of the original team, with the exception of Cyclops, leave. He and Iceman go to Los Angeles, where they found the Champions with Hercules, the Black Widow, and the original Ghost Rider. Following the apparent death of Jean Grey and Cyclops' subsequent exile from the team, Warren rejoins the X-Men. During this time, Angel unsuccessfully pursues pop star Alison Blaire, also known as Dazzler. He grows increasingly disturbed by the behavior and actions of Wolverine, and quits the team in protest.

He is kidnapped by the Morlock leader Callisto, who intends to force Angel to be her lover. Storm, Nightcrawler, Colossus, and Sprite arrive in time to stop Callisto from cutting off Angel's wings (believing that without them, Angel will be unable to flee from her). Storm fights and defeats Callisto for the right to be the leader of the Morlocks, effectively freeing Angel in the process.

Shortly thereafter, Angel joins the Defenders, along with Beast, Iceman, and girlfriend Candy Southern. Using Angel's Colorado house as their base, the group has several adventures before most of the group are killed freeing teammate Moondragon from demonic possession.

Angel considers retirement following the collapse of the Defenders, but the discovery of Jean Grey alive changes his mind. Jean Grey is furious at the increase in anti-mutant hysteria in the two years she has been missing, and opposes the X-Men's decision to align themselves with the villain Magneto. To appease Jean's desire for action, Warren organizes X-Factor. He recruits his old prep school friend Cameron Hodge to run the team, unaware that Cameron hates mutants, particularly Warren. Since Cyclops is married to Madelyne Pryor at the time and reacts coldly to Jean's return, Angel takes advantage of Jean's need for emotional support and expresses his love for her. This destroys Warren's relationship with Candy Southern, after Candy finds Warren consoling Jean.

Archangel 
X-Factor's formation begins a period of upheaval in Warren's life. Cameron Hodge abuses Warren's trust and portrays X-Factor as "mutant hunters" for hire, further fueling anti-mutant sentiment. An altercation with the Brotherhood of Mutants allows Mystique to discover the relationship between the "mutant hunters" and the former X-Men; she exposes Warren as the financial backer for X-Factor, causing a public relations nightmare. Warren's wings are mutilated during the Mutant Massacre by the Marauder, Harpoon. When the wings develop gangrene, Cameron Hodge violates Angel's wishes and has the crippled wings amputated. Despondent over the loss, Warren escapes the hospital and commandeers his private jet. It explodes in the air as the rest of X-Factor watch helplessly from below. It is ultimately revealed that Hodge sabotaged Warren's plane in order to finish off his nemesis, in an apparent suicide.

Seconds before the explosion, Warren is spirited away by the ancient mutant Apocalypse. Apocalypse offers to restore Angel's wings if Angel will serve him as one of his Four Horsemen. Apocalypse subjects Angel to extensive genetic alterations, giving him blue skin and organic metal wings which can cut through almost anything. The wings can fire the metal feathers as projectiles. Apocalypse gives Worthington the title of Death. He makes Worthington the leader of his Horsemen after Worthington beats the others in a fight, and gives him a drug that remove his reservations to follow Apocalypse's dark plans. Death is unveiled to X-Factor during their second encounter with the Horsemen, and Warren sadistically exploits the weaknesses of his friends to defeat them in combat. During a later attack on Manhattan, Iceman fakes his own death at Warren's hands, hoping that the shock of killing a friend will enable him to break free of the influence of Apocalypse's drug. Although freed, Warren refuses to rejoin X-Factor, feeling that he has changed too much psychologically to be a hero.

He seeks out Candy Southern, but finds that she is missing. Warren learns that Candy has been lobotomized to protect Cameron Hodge's secrets, including the establishment of the anti-mutant militia "The Right" using funds embezzled from Worthington. In the confrontation that follows, Hodge murders Candy in front of Warren and Warren decapitates Hodge. Changing his codename from "Death" to "Dark Angel", he later rejoins X-Factor and takes the codename "Archangel" during the events of Inferno.

Warren later meets and becomes romantically involved with Charlotte Jones, a New York City Police officer and single mother. It is with Charlotte's help that X-Factor frees Warren from the Ravens, a cult of near-immortal psychic vampires. It is during this battle that Warren's survival is made public knowledge, allowing him to regain control over his family's remaining business holdings and his personal fortune. X-Factor rejoins the X-Men following the defeat of the Shadow King on Muir Island.

Angel again 
After rejoining the X-Men, Archangel's brooding behavior lessens, after Jean reveals to Warren that his wings (which Warren believes have a mind of their own) have actually been operating off Warren's own unconscious desires for violence. This, combined with Warren's accidental decapitation of Mutant Liberation Front member Kamikaze, leads Warren to try to reject the dark cloud that has hung over his head ever since gaining his new wings. His relationship with Charlotte Jones fades as Warren begins dating fellow X-Men member Psylocke. In an attempt to put his dark days behind him, Warren retires his "Death" uniform in favor of the blue/white costume Magneto made for him.

After Psylocke is eviscerated by X-Men prisoner Sabretooth during an escape attempt, Warren and the X-Men track him down and capture him, but not before he is able to badly damage Warren's metal wings. Over time, the damage to his wings spreads. Eventually, the metal wings shatter completely, revealing that his feathered wings have been growing back within them and have broken them apart from the inside. This follows a visit from Ozymandias, who tells him that he is indeed one of Apocalypse's chosen ones. Reclaiming his original Angel powers, Warren still retains his blue skin color.

Angel is one of several X-Men who are present when Gambit's culpability in the events of the "Mutant Massacre" is made public by Magneto, which turns him against his teammate. Shortly afterwards, with the X-Men broke and their mansion stripped bare by the US Government, Angel volunteers money to help keep the team going, though this requires his reclaiming full control over his family company to do so. Tracking some of his company's finances at this time, Warren discovers the former villains the Thunderbolts retrieving a jet that was used by the Champions, but although initially suspicious of the Thunderbolts' motives, after joining them in a confrontation with Graviton, Warren accepts their genuine desire to reform, leaving them with the jet as he wishes them luck. Angel returns to the X-Men following the events of The Twelve, in which his wings (temporarily) further mutate into wings made of light and he gains talon-like hands and healing powers, which Warren uses to restore the mobility of crippled Horseman of Apocalypse War. Returning to the X-Men, Warren finds his relationship with Psylocke gone, as she has begun dating new X-Men recruit Thunderbird III.

When Rogue leaves the X-Men to join Storm's splinter group (X-Treme X-Men), Angel is promoted to head of the X-Men's field team. Angel's squad fights the anti-mutant group Church of Humanity and Mystique and her newest incarnation of the Brotherhood of Evil Mutants, and tangles with the Vanisher, who has gone into business with several medical companies to create a designer drug that could give humans mutant-like powers. Angel also becomes entangled in a love triangle with rookie X-Men member Paige Guthrie and the mutant prostitute Stacy X. Furthermore, during a battle with Black Tom Cassidy, Angel's regression to his pre-"Death" state is complete when he reverts to his normal Caucasian skin color when Cassidy (now turned into a plant-type vampire) attempts to drain Angel's life force from him. His healing powers from The Twelve also manifest themselves again, in the form of the revelation that Angel's blood has miracle healing properties.

Decimation 
Following the death of Jean Grey, Warren and Paige take an extended leave of absence from the team. Warren begins doing overseas charity work at this point, in the form of a charity called "Mutants Sans Frontières" in Zanzibar (a reference to Doctors Without Borders), where he then proceeds to help stop a coup with the aid of Professor X's newest charges from nearby Genosha. In Excalibur, Warren meets up again with Callisto. As Paige reminds Warren of his history with Callisto, Viper attacks, but Warren and Callisto defeat Viper together.

In Generation M, Angel fakes having lost his wings in order to capture the Ghoul, a deranged serial killer who uses his retained mutant powers to murder ex-mutants.

Though not an active member of any team, Warren reunites with the other surviving original X-Men — Cyclops, Iceman, and Beast — in a mission to stop Bishop from recapturing the fugitive mutants known as the 198, though Bishop later joins them in their rescue attempt.

World War Hulk 
Angel joins with Hercules, Namora, and Amadeus Cho to calm down the rampaging Hulk. Afterward, Angel discovers that Amadeus Cho has hacked into Warren's bank accounts and stolen several million dollars from him, to help him further aid the Hulk.

Messiah Complex 
Angel is part of the team that investigates the new mutant birth in Alaska. He is later part of the team who is looking for former Acolytes. He is next seen part of the same team, but attacking the Marauders. Warren goes against Mister Sinister, but is easily defeated once Sinister recovers from Emma Frost's mental attack. Angel is knocked out, but recovers and is present with the X-teams for the final battle over the fate of the baby.

Divided We Stand 
Angel is later seen flying over San Francisco, going to meet with Hepzibah, Warpath, and Iceman, when he stumbles across an area that looks as if the 1960s never ended. He contacts Scott and Emma, asking them for assistance before suffering the mind-altering effects of the zone, which are revealed to be caused by Martinique Jason. Angel and the three other ensnared X-Men are sent by Martinique to confront Scott and Emma. Emma manages to free them from the illusion and, during the fall-out battle, Angel rescues Mayor Sadie Sinclair. Thankful for the assistance and for the idea of having real superheroes in their city, Mayor Sinclair then talks to Cyclops and Angel about helping them resettle the X-Men in San Francisco.

Archangel returns 
In X-Force vol. 3 #4, Warren is brutally attacked by a mind-controlled Wolfsbane. During the attack, Wolfsbane savagely rips Warren's feather wings from his back and runs away, taking the wings with her. It is revealed by Elixir that Warren's wings, despite appearing fully organic, are actually still techno-organic constructs that he is unable to regenerate. Wolfsbane later delivers them to the Purifiers, who are seeking the Apocalypse Strain, the techno-organics which comprise Warren's wings. The Purifiers use the Apocalypse Strain to modify an army of Purifier agents, giving them the same metallic wings that Archangel once had. Meanwhile, although Elixir is able to heal all of Warren's injuries, he cannot regrow his wings due to interference from the Apocalypse Strain. Later in the story, Warren is gripped by a series of excruciating seizures that not only mysteriously regenerate his techno-organic wings, but also transform him back into Apocalypse's version of Death/Archangel, complete with blue skin and a techno-organic version of his uniform.

X-Force attacks Archangel, who eventually asks for relief from the pain of losing his wings and transforming into Archangel. Archangel escapes, to take revenge on the Purifiers, and at their headquarters he slaughters most of them in a blood-maddened rage. Once the battle is over, he reverts to his normal Caucasian, feather-winged appearance. He comments to Wolverine that he can still feel the metal wings inside him, and that they want to come out again. According to Elixir, Warren's transformation is permanent, implying that he is fully capable of transforming back into Archangel again at any time.

In an attempt to understand what was done to both Wolfsbane and Angel, the pair of them are placed in a room together, where Rahne is forced to gaze at Warren. The mere sight of him causes her to become murderous once again, and she attempts to rip the wings from Warren's body once more. The sight of a psychotic Wolfsbane, as well as the fear of having his wings torn from his body again, causes a defensive reaction in Warren, reverting him back into his violent Archangel persona.

From then on, Angel takes dual membership with both the X-Men and X-Force, though Cyclops forbids Angel from telling the rest of the team about the return of his Archangel powers. While recruiting a scientist for Beast's "Science Squad", the X-Club, Angel is forced to transform into Archangel in order to destroy a giant rampaging monster. Beast reacts in anger that Angel has not told him that his "Death" powers have returned, creating tension between the two friends. Angel knows telling Beast would expose the latest incarnation of X-Force and effectively end Cyclops' latest tenure as leader if the truth about his personal black ops squad became public knowledge.

During the X-Club's trip to 1906 in order to discover the origins of the modern mutant race, Angel transforms into Archangel a number of times to help further their mission.

During the Fear Itself storyline, Wolverine and Archangel interrogate Purifiers member Benedict Ryan on where Jonathan Standish is hiding out.

Dark Angel Saga 
In the "Dark Angel Saga", the "Archangel" persona of Warren, which was secretly created when he was first transformed by Apocalypse into his  Horseman of Death, has finally taken over his mind, and he plans to be the heir to Apocalypse, bringing Ozymandias, Dark Beast, the Final Horsemen, Autumn Rolfson, and her son Genocide as his army to destroy humanity. At the conclusion of the story arc Betsy stabs Archangel in the chest with the Celestial Life Seed, seemingly killing him. In the aftermath of the explosion of Apocalypse's citadel, Warren is seen by the members of X-Force walking in the snow. Psylocke, shocked that he is alive and apparently free of Apocalypse, runs up and embraces him. This Warren then reveals he had no idea who Psylocke is and appears to have amnesia. Warren has his normal white skin again but seems to have retained his metallic wings.

Death and new personality 
Following the Dark Angel Saga, it is revealed that Warren had indeed died and his soul departed for the afterlife, with his Celestial-mutated body now hosting an all-new personality with its own soul. He lost leadership of Worthington Industries and became a student in Wolverine's new school for mutants.
Although the new entity, who has chosen to retain the same name of Warren Worthington III and the code name of "Angel" is making efforts to be integrated, it is clear that he has no memory at all of the original Warren Worthington's friends and acquaintances, as his discussions with Iceman demonstrate and how he turned away former lover Psylocke.

When Wolverine's legs were damaged Warren tried to fix them with a "miracle". When he failed he wanted to try it again but Wolverine wouldn't allow him, so he and a few other students went to the casino on Planet Sin. There they took the device that damaged their headmaster's legs so it could be used to heal him. While doing so he forged a friendship with Evan, a clone of Apocalypse.

Warren tried to prove that he truly was a real angel by flying to heaven but he failed and accepted the fact that he was mutant. While falling he was saved by Evan and revealed that he could see the essence of people when he looked at them. Evan asked him what he saw when he looked at him and despite seeing only the image of Apocalypse, Warren told him that he could see nothing but goodness in him.

Warren left the school with Bobby and Rachel to help his fellow mutants in the battle against the Avengers. He returned to join the X-Men, the Avengers and Nova against Cyclops, and has since regained all of his memories.

Warren's children 
In an apocalyptic possible future, an aging Frank Castle warns the present-day Deadpool of the "son of Archangel". During Uncanny Avengers (2013), it is revealed that while preparing to ascend as Apocalypse during the "Dark Angel Saga", Warren fathered two children with Pestilence of the Final Horsemen, who appear as the time-traveling "Apocalypse Twins".

All-New, All-Different Marvel 
As part of the All-New, All-Different Marvel event, Angel has mysteriously reverted somehow to his pre-LifeSeed blue-skinned Archangel form, and appears as a member of Magneto's new Uncanny X-Men in order to protect mutantkind at all costs. His mind had also changed, having become nothing more than a silent and mindless predator controlled by Psylocke. Under her psychic leash, Archangel became a heavy hitter in Magneto's X-Men.

Apocalypse Wars 
Psylocke and Magneto travel to Green Ridge, Colorado to investigate reports of an up-and-coming preacher who looks identical to the original Angel. They discover that he is indeed the Angel who was created by the Celestial LifeSeed and he is attracting a cult of religious fanatics around him. It is revealed that during the 8-month timeskip after the events of Secret Wars, Angel allied himself with Apocalypse's son, Genocide and the Clan Akkaba in exchange for their help in controlling his Horseman of Death split-personality, which has revived as it is permanently linked to his own metal wings. Clan Akkaba are constantly harvesting Angel's rapidly-regenerating metal wings (in order to prevent the Death persona from fully possessing Angel) and grafting them into his clones, creating a mindless clone army of blue-skinned Archangels. The silent Archangel who is a member of Magneto's team of X-Men was merely the first such clone who retained trace memories of the original Angel and thus managed to escape to join Magneto's X-Men. Magneto and Psylocke are captured, but Psylocke easily escapes. She gets into a fight with Fantomex, who was sent by Magneto as back-up with Mystique, who herself freed Magneto. Psylocke in a panic calls for the Archangel who is their teammate, who then telepathically controls the rest of the clone army into destroying the town, but the clones are all killed. In a flashback, it is revealed that Magneto accidentally found Angel's unconscious and injured body in a barn during the 8-month timeskip and helped him recover. Magneto at the time gave up on being a hero, as the rest of the X-Men had either disbanded or fled to Limbo, but then was inspired by Angel to restart his own version of the Uncanny X-Men. It is implied that Angel disappeared after that encounter, only to "reappear" as the silent Archangel. In the present, a chastised and repentant Angel explains to Magneto and Psylocke that he and the silent Archangel are ultimately two half-parts of the same one being, so they physically combine into a new blue-skinned persona. This new Archangel being is unsure of who or what he now was, but was determined to find out. He swore off all violence and returned with Magneto's X-Men to their base in the Savage Land.

Powers and abilities

As Angel 

Warren's primary power is that of natural flight, due to his large feathered wings. His wings have superhuman strength, and they have a very flexible skeletal structure that enables him to press them to the back of his torso and legs with only the slightest bulge visible under his clothing. His bones are hollow, his body processes food much more efficiently than a normal human body and does not store any excess fat, and he possesses a greater proportionate muscle mass than normal. As a result, his strength, speed, agility, flexibility, endurance, reflexes, coordination, balance, eyesight and hearing are at their peak. Elements of his anatomy are comparable to those of birds, especially birds of prey. His eyes can withstand high-speed winds which would damage the average human eye. He can breathe at high velocities or altitudes, and he can cope with the reduced temperatures at high altitudes for prolonged periods of time, giving him a greater-than-normal capacity to endure low temperatures in areas such as the Arctic. The strength in his natural wings can easily break a man's arm or leg, or even put someone through a wall.

While he generally flies below the height of clouds, Angel can reach almost twice this height with little effort. At his absolute maximum, he can reach the highest recorded altitude of a bird in flight — about the height of Mount Everest — but he can only remain that high for a few minutes. Although flight is as natural a mode of transportation for Angel as for a bird, he can only fly nonstop under his own power for around half a day.

He has undergone heavy training with Professor X, especially in mastering his flight indoors. He has demonstrated superior agility, flexibility, reflexes, coordination, and balance while flying, and has been shown defeating superbeings much faster than him (like the Human Torch) by dodging them and having them smash against the ground or a wall at full speed.

Angel is also an accomplished hand-to-hand combatant, having defeated several of the werewolf-like homo superior when Wolverine is defeated. He is trained in hand-to-hand combat at Xavier's school; while dating Psylocke, he receives a considerable amount of martial arts instruction. During his years on the team, he is given extensive training from Wolverine, and when he once surprises Wolverine after taking down some men, he says, "My father spoiled me with more than money." He also receives further instruction from the Black Widow and Hercules during his days with the Champions.

As the result of a secondary mutation which has been shown inconsistently, Angel also develops a healing factor and can heal others by mixing his blood with theirs, provided they have a matching blood type to Warren's. His healing blood does not work with Nightcrawler. Although powerful, this mutation varies in potency. At times, he cannot aid the terminally wounded; at others, he can actually raise the recently dead. This secondary mutation suggests that he may be descended from the ancient race of Cheyarafim mutants. He is nearly immune to injury because his healing blood is constantly flowing through him. At its onset, he repairs broken bones in days, but his healing abilities have enhanced since then. In an issue of X-Force it is apparent that this healing factor comes from his wings as seen when Warren is savagely attacked and his wings are ripped from his body, his healing factor fails to work, and he instead must be healed by Josh Foley. It is revealed that the Celestial Technology bonded to him by Apocalypse prevents Elixir from regenerating his wings. They eventually regenerate on their own.

Aside from his superhuman powers, the original Warren was a most-highly capable businessman and the new Warren has accordingly retained or "inherited" his position as the primary stockholder and chairman emeritus (former chairman) of the board-of-directors of Worthington Industries.

As Archangel 
Archangel possesses a set of metal techno-organic wings grafted onto him by the genetic engineering of Apocalypse when Apocalypse renames him the Horseman of Death. These wings are composed of a hard, sharp, organic material that resembles the "organic steel" of Colossus' body. The wings give him the ability to project his metallic feathers out from his wings at great speed and with tremendous force, enabling them to pierce even steel, tipped with poison.

Archangel does not have complete control over his feathers, which sometimes shoot from his wings against his conscious will in response to his unconscious aggressive drives. The feathers are laced with a neural inhibitor chemical, generated by Archangel's body, which induces temporary paralysis.
These wings allow him to fly at speeds much faster than his natural, feathered wings. The edges of these metal wings are also razor sharp, allowing them to be used as weapons.

While he believes he has lost his metal wings when he re-grows his organic ones, the Celestial Technology never leaves his system, and his natural-appearing wings contain the Celestial technology. When implanted into regular human beings, the technology induces a transformation similar to that of Warren's. When his feathered wings are severed from his body by Wolfsbane, his metal wings grow back in their place. Furthermore, his skin reverts to blue and his old Archangel costume appears. Warren's body returns to normal — the metal wings being replaced with the appearance of his feathered ones — indicating that Warren has the ability to switch between metal and feathered wings and his Angel and Archangel appearances. As Archangel, Warren retains his healing factor. The wings have been shown capable to heal Apocalypse.. In issue 14 of X-Men: Second Coming, Dr. Nemesis questions the rate that they would grow as the biology is different from Colossus' armor.

After the death of Warren and the Archangel persona via the Life Seed, Angel comes back to life as an amnesiac with healing powers far beyond what he was ever able to originally accomplish, as demonstrated when he resurrects a recently dead dog.

Time-displaced Warren Worthington III 

The time displaced Warren, from All-New X-Men, initially started with feathered wings, but during The Black Vortex saga, he submitted to the vortex and was imbued with Cosmic wings. Most of the other heroes who submitted returned their powers, but Warren did not; hoping to change his future with the new powers. These new wings allow him to travel at faster than light speeds. He can also discharge cosmic blasts that can destroy spaceships. He can also feed off cosmic energy, thus survive in outer space and without sustenance. These wings were surgically removed by a younger version of Cable and replaced with wings that Mimic had copied from Angel in their original meeting, allowing him to be returned to the past with no effect on the timeline.

Reception

Critical reception 
Shawn S. Lealos of Screen Rant ranked Warren 1st in their "X-Men: 10 Most Powerful Horsemen Of Apocalypse" list, while Lukkas Shayo included him in their "10 Iconic New York City-Based Marvel Superheroes We Haven't Seen In The MCU" list. Hilary Goldstein and Richard George of IGN ranked Warren 11th in their "Top 25 X-Men" list. Darren Franich of Entertainment Weekly ranked Warren 40th in their "Let's rank every X-Man ever" list. of ComicsAlliance ranked Warren 75th in their "100 Greatest X-Men of All Time" list. CBR.com ranked Warren 4th in their "X-Men: The 5 Deadliest Members Of The Hellfire Club (& The 5 Weakest)" list, 6th in their "X-Force: 20 Powerful Members" list, 9th in their "10 Most Terrifying X-Men" list, and 10th in their "10 Greatest X-Men, Ranked By Courage" list.

Literary reception

Volumes

Angel: Revelations - 2008 
According to Diamond Comic Distributors, Angel: Revelations #1 was the 106th best selling comic book in May 2008. Angel: Revelations #2 was the 125th best selling comic book in June 2008.

James Hunt of CBR.com called Angel: Revelations #1 a "prodigious talent on display," saying, "The religious imagery gives the book a consistent motif and the literal "angel" aspect of the character takes a lot more focus that it usually receives when the character is dealt with. Of all the X-Men, Warren probably has the "origin" story that relates itself most directly to the idea of emergent mutant powers being a metaphor for adolescence. Being a Marvel Knights title, it's unclear whether this origin is "in-continuity" or not, but ultimately it shouldn't matter. If the rest of the series is as good as this opening issue, it's going to be an utterly beautiful read and, if you're reading this at a time when it's too late to start collecting the series, it'll almost certainly be worth splashing out for the hardcover just to make sure the format does the story justice. It's definitely good to see Marvel happy to put out a series that looks a little more experimental than their usual fare, and if there's any justice in the industry it'll pay off nicely." Bryan Joel of IGN gave Angel: Revelations #1 a grade of 8.1 out of 10, writing, "Truthfully, Angel's origin probably needed an update. Considering the sort of character he's become and the advancements his powers eventually received, the origin doesn't really line up. Thankfully, Aguirre-Sacasa seems to agree and has crafted Revelations to remedy that. Issue #1 features the basics of Warren immediately pre-power onset, where he's attending a private school and worrying about the changes to his body. The script also interjects a couple scenes of more sinister things going on, which elevates this above the level of simple rehash. There almost seems to be more attention paid to religion, a pet theme of Aguirre-Sacasa's; the title of this series isn't just a play on words. Suffice it to say, I'm surprisingly interested to see how this all plays out.  One of the main selling points, though, is the art by Adam Pollina. Probably most renowned for his extended run on the first volume of X-Force, his work in Revelationscouldn't be further from the tradition style seen there. Now he's somewhere between Skottie Young and... Salvador Dali, perhaps? But in a good way. I can definitely see how the weird, deformed style will bug some readers, but I think it's deeply engaging and gives the whole issue a more spiritual and mystical feel. It might not be exactly in step with an Angel series, but it's at least something different and I appreciate that."

Iceman and Angel - 2011 
According to Diamond Comic Distributors, Iceman and Angel #1 was the 161st best selling comic book in March 2011.

Ryan K. Lindsay of CBR.com called Iceman and Angel #1 "as much fun as you want, but as pithy as you expect too," asserting, "A one-shot should be a comic that stands on its own, and this issue certainly does that. It needs to give you enough narrative meat to feel like the money was well invested, and this issue mostly does that. It should elicit some form of strong reaction from you in the few pages it has, and this issue works hard to make you laugh and is more successful than not. See Namor score some bagels and Googam become a broheim. It's not earth shattering but it is solid fun and sometimes that's just what you need. Pick up this comic and feel the freedom of old funny done-in-one comics just like they did when you were a kid where the parts add up to greater than the actual whole." David Brothers of ComicsAlliance ranked Iceman and Angel #1 10th in their "10 Top Marvel Comics Coming in March 2011," saying, "One of the best things we don't see much of any more is the relationship between the original X-Men. The modern series is all about hard decisions, hard edges, and hard core self protection, but back in the day, they were just a bunch of kids who hung out together. Iceman and Angel in particular were pretty fun together, because one was a goofball and the other was a self-styled ladies man. Brian Clevinger has proven that he can do stories like this, where he takes a slice of time and expands on it in a meaningful way, and Juan Doe is a pretty great artist. Add in GOOM, a classic Marvel villain, and you've got a story that I think is going to be a pretty good read. X-Men First Class may be dead in name, but these one-shots are doing a pretty good job of keeping the feeling alive."

Other versions

Time-displaced Warren Worthington III

All-New X-Men 

When Beast decides to travel back in time to recruit the original X-Men to stop Scott committing mutant genocide, Angel accompanies his teammates into the future, but initially prefers to return to the past rather than remain in such a twisted present. Even after his teammates vote to remain until they have saved the future, Angel expresses curiosity about what has happened to his own future self, as no reference has been made to his present condition. The next day, the rebirthed Angel finds the younger Angel who asks him why he has metallic wings; the older Angel ignores the question and invites his younger self to go flying. While flying above the skies of New York, the two Angels become caught up in H.Y.D.R.A.'s attack on Avengers Tower. Together, the two heroes are able to defeat the terrorists and capture Madame Hydra.

Joining Cyclops and gaining cosmic wings 
Frustrated after seeing what will happen to himself in the future, the younger Angel defects from the Jean Grey School for Higher Learning and joins the older Cyclops' new team of outlaw X-Men. After the 2013 "Battle of the Atom" storyline, the rest of the displaced X-Men also join Cyclops' team, except for young Cyclops, who joins his father Corsair and the Starjammers. Warren then starts a romantic relationship with X-23. Later, the All-New X-Men accidentally travel to the Ultimate Universe, where Angel and X-23 encounter that universe's version of Wolverine's son, Jimmy Hudson and the X-Men. During the events of the 2015 storyline "The Black Vortex", young Warren is imbued with cosmic powers and gains magic wings of light. When asked by X-23 why he risked his life to gain new powers, he said he hoped that changing himself will alter his future and prevent him from being transformed into Archangel.

ResurreXion 
After the X-Men go to war against the Inhumans over the fate of the Terrigen, Angel joins the rest of the time-displaced X-Men in hopes of finally returning them to their own timeline. However they discover that they aren't from Earth 616's timeline and with no way of figuring out which timeline they're from, they become stranded on Earth 616. With this knowledge in mind, Angel and the rest of the time-displaced X-Men leave the main team of X-Men to find their place in the world.<ref>X-Men: Prime #1</ref> Angel joins the rest of the time-displaced X-Men alongside Magneto.

After a series of adventures - which included the discovery that they actually were from the true past and the X-Men they had witnessed were actually the disguised Brotherhood of Mutants attempting to change history - the X-Men are forced to return to the past when they are attacked by Ahab, a mutant-hunter from the future, and a younger version of Cable who feels that his future self has lost his way. Part of young-Cable's efforts include surgically removing Warren's new cosmic wings and replacing them with the wings Mimic copied from Warren in the past. The team eventually return to the past, with Jean planting a psychic block on their memories so that they will forget about their experiences in the future until they catch up with the moment they departed.

 1602 
In the 1602 timeline, Warren becomes Werner, a young witchbreed (as mutants are known in this reality) who hides his mutation using garments sewn by his mother. Unfortunately, he is captured and almost burnt at the stake by the Grand Inquisitor Enrique (a.k.a. Magneto), but rescued at the last moment by Carlos Javier and his students. Safe in England, Werner befriends John Grey unaware that "Master John" is in fact a young woman disguised as a man. This friendship causes jealousy on the part of Scotius Summerisle, who knows of the deception and fears Werner also knows and is trying to court her. They almost come to blows but are reconciled when circumstances lead to Jean's death. It then comes to light that Werner is unaware of Master John's true gender but states that he "was in love with that young man".

 Age of Apocalypse 
In the Age of Apocalypse, Warren is never remade as Death by Apocalypse, nor does he ever join the X-Men. Instead, as most of New York is destroyed, Angel works with Apocalypse's mutant elite, Magneto and his X-Men, and even the Human High Council to maintain and operate a nightclub aptly named Heaven, where humans and mutants can intermingle. When two of his employees, Scarlett MacKenzie and Karma, are apprehended and later killed, Angel finally chooses a side. Strapping himself down with a number of bombs, he attacks Apocalypse's citadel in a suicide run. His sacrifice shuts down the protective shields surrounding the citadel, providing the X-Men with a much needed entrance.

 Earth-5701 
In Earth-5701, an Age of Apocalypse-like reality seen in Cable & Deadpool #15, Warren has also been turned into Death and helps Apocalypse conquer the world.

 Earth X 
In this alternate universe, Warren loses his fortune and becomes an authentic angel, who helps anybody who needs him. He joins the New York City Police and his old friend Iceman to protect the world-altering Torch of the city against the forces of Mephisto. Later, he travels with Mister Fantastic and others to the Negative Zone in the search for Paradise.

 Exiles 
Archangel appeared in the comic book Exiles as a member of Weapon X, a more ruthless version of the self-titled reality hopping team. This Archangel, hailing from Earth-714, appears very much like his Earth-616 counterpart, even wearing a costume very similar to the one the 616-version wears at the time. Of course, this Archangel, since he is selected for Weapon X rather than the Exiles themselves, is more savage, employing the excessive use of automatic weapons. Archangel is, at some point, replaced by a sociopathic version of Ms. Marvel after he is supposedly sent home for completing his number of missions. He is actually placed in the Panoptichron gallery of fallen Exiles. Why he is placed there is unknown, but he is one of only five recruits to return home alive and intact, alongside She-Hulk, Beak, Iron Man, and Daredevil.

 Marvel Zombies 
Angel is infected by the zombies Rogue and Ms. Marvel. He participates in a zombie attack on the castle of Doctor Doom. The zombies have detected unaffected humans inside. He later appears in Marvel Zombies 3 when he attacks Jocasta, Ultron and Machine Man, but he is killed soon after. Angel is also confirmed as one of the few X-Men who attack Juggernaut.

 Mutant X 
In the alternate reality represented in the comic book Mutant X, Warren Worthington is captured by Apocalypse much like he is in the main Marvel timeline. Instead of blue skin and metallic wings, this version of Warren is given chalk white skin, leathery bat-wings, razor sharp claws and fangs, and the ability to breathe fire. Able to shake off Apocalypse's brainwashing, but still affected by the horrors he has endured, he becomes bitter, and often lashes out at his teammates in the superhero team the Six. Though he insists on being called the Fallen, his friends still call him Warren, to his chagrin. The Six is a continuation of the original X-Men legacy, in a reality where Alex Summers was the first X-Man instead of his older brother Scott.

When Madelyne Pryor becomes possessed by the Goblin Force and takes over New York, the Fallen defects from the Six alongside her, and vanishes after her defeat. He next appears allied again with Apocalypse against the threat of the Xavier/Shadow King entity. He is one of the very few surviving heroes after the combined attack of the Goblin Force controlled Beyonder and the revived Dracula. He allies himself with a reformed Six.

He makes one final appearance at the end of the series, when Doctor Strange summons the Fallen, along with Xavier, Reed Richards, and others to help Alex prepare for his battle with the Beyonder.

 New Exiles 
On the world of the Sons of Iron and Daughters of the Dragon, the New Exiles face a squad of alternate "core X-Men" who are loyal to Lilandra. These X-Men include an alternate version of Warren who is codenamed "Krait" and has many similarities to his Archangel Earth-616 appearance.

 Shadow-X 
New Excalibur battles an evil counterpart of Angel, who is a member of the Shadow-X, the X-Men of an alternate reality in which Professor X is possessed by the Shadow King. They are brought to Earth-616 as a result of M-Day. He is later killed by one of the Shadow Captains.

 Ultimate Marvel 
The Ultimate version of Angel (Warren Worthington III) is one of only a few mutants to identifiably be a mutant at birth. Warren comes from millionaire, mutant-bigoted parents who quickly sign guardianship of him over to Charles Xavier. Warren joins the X-Men taking the code name Angel, though he proves to be an inexperienced and reluctant fighter. There is much controversy over Angel joining the X-Men, as there are many protests of angels being a sign of God; also, Rogue does not like the fact that he has the appearance of an angel. On an unauthorized mission to Genosha, Angel and his teammates attempt to rescue Longshot, an accused murderer who is facing a public execution. During the Magnetic North storyline, Dazzler and Warren go to the Triskelion in an attempt to rescue Polaris. After Magneto shuts down the power, Dazzler is impaled by one of Lady Deathstrike's claws, leaving her in a coma. Angel faces Professor Xavier and takes responsibility. Under the guise of expulsion, Angel joins Emma Frost's Academy of Tomorrow as a spy for Xavier.

Warren becomes close friends with Nightcrawler, initially due to the fact that they both have physical mutations. Warren gets over his initial attraction to Storm, and after the events in Genosha, engages in a relationship with Dazzler. After Bishop recruits Dazzler in his new team of X-Men, she makes Angel part of the team (despite Bishop's protests). While trying to protect the Morlocks he is shot to death by Mister Sinister. Thanks to Jean Grey, he later returns to life. He is seen as a member of Colossus' enhanced team, his appearance drastically altered through the use of Banshee, the Ultimate version of Mutant Growth Hormone (MGH), resulting in Warren having an eagle-like head and feathered upper torso. The mutation seems to have progressed, as he is now completely feathered and has talons and double-jointed knees. During the Ultimatum event, Warren is brutally killed by Sabertooth.

Angel's powers include feathered wings, hollow bone structure, and zero body fat, allowing flight. He also has heightened strength, speed, agility, reflexes, coordination, balance, endurance, and eyesight. He does not appear to have the healing powers of his 616 Universe counterpart.

 X-Men: Fairy Tales 
In the first issue of X-Men Fairy Tales, based on the Japanese story of Momotarō, Archangel appears as a pheasant. He refuses to fly because he is scared of falling and failing, until Cyclops/Hitomi and Beast/Aoi convince him.

He is named Tenshi, meaning "Angel" in Japanese.

 What If...? 
In What If Archangel Fell From Grace?, Archangel is still the Angel of Death and violently murders criminals. He fights Cyclops, Jean Grey, and Beast and flees after injuring Beast and Cyclops. Cameron Hodge and N'astirh, Master of Demons, hold Candy Southern captive, causing Archangel to exact vengeance. He teams with N'astirh to create the door to Inferno, but sacrifices himself by merging with the demon to prevent Inferno.

In What If Angel killed X-Factor and Horsemen?, Archangel defected back to X-Factor far more quickly than he did in canon, serving as a proactive force that acted against their enemies. However, as Apocalypse's philosophies of 'Survival of the Fittest' became more and more prominent in his mind, Warren killed not only X-Factor's enemies, but even went on to kill X-Factor and Apocalypse's Horsemen, justifying his actions by saying that his victims had proved themselves unworthy of survival by trusting him. The issue concluded with Archangel clashing with Apocalypse to determine whether he was worthy of survival, Apocalypse feeling that Archangel had gone too far as he would have judged some of Archangel's victims as worth surviving.

 Prelude to Deadpool Corps 
In the second issue, a universe is shown where Angel is an orphaned kid at Professor X Orphanage for troubled kids. At a dance between Professor X's and Emma Frost's orphanages, Angel teams up with kid versions of Wolverine and Colossus to take on the kid version of Deadpool (named Kidpool).

 In other media 
 Television 
 Warren Worthington III as Angel appears in "The Sub-Mariner" segment of The Marvel Super Heroes.
 Warren Worthington III as Angel appears in Spider-Man and His Amazing Friends, voiced by William Callaway.
 Warren Worthington III as Archangel appears in X-Men: The Animated Series, voiced by Stephen Ouimette. This version is unaffiliated with the X-Men. He goes to a scientist who claims to be able to cure genetic mutations, but realizes too late that it was Mystique, who brainwashes him into becoming Apocalypse's Horseman of Death. Under Apocalypse's control, Worthington battles the X-Men before Rogue absorbs his dark side. Following this, Worthington sets out on a quest to get revenge on Apocalypse, with Rogue joining him in the hopes of dissuading him. Along the way, Worthington learns that he will join the X-Men in the future.
 Warren Worthington III as Angel appears in X-Men: Evolution, voiced by Mark Hildreth, This version is a young multi-billionaire who donned a costume and mask to perform heroic deeds in New York City until his actions draw Magneto's attention. Worthington would later join the X-Men and aid in their fight against Apocalypse.
 Warren Worthington III as Angel and Archangel appears in Wolverine and the X-Men, voiced by Liam O'Brien. This version is initially a member of the X-Men as Angel until the Mutant Response Division damage his wings, forcing Worthington to seek out Mister Sinister, who converts him into Archangel and recruits the former into his Marauders.
 Warren Worthington III as Archangel appears in the Marvel Anime: X-Men episode "Destiny".

 Film 
 Warren Worthington III as Angel appears in an early draft of X-Men, but did not make it past pre-production.
 Warren Worthington III as Archangel was going to appear in X2 as one of William Stryker's experiments, but was cut from the film. Despite this, an x-ray image displaying him appears in one of Stryker's labs.
 Warren Worthington III as Angel appears in X-Men: The Last Stand, portrayed by Ben Foster as a young man and Cayden Boyd as a child. This version is a young man in his early twenties and the son of an industrialist who became motivated by his son's mutation to create a "mutant cure".
 A viral marketing website for X-Men: Days of Future Past shows that Angel was killed in 2011 by the Sentinels during a mutant protest march against the Sentinel program. 
 Warren Worthington III as Angel and Archangel appears in X-Men: Apocalypse, portrayed by Ben Hardy. This version's wings possess sharp talons. Hailing from the 1980s, he initially works as a cage fighter before he is injured by Nightcrawler and transformed into Archangel by Apocalypse. In his new form, Worthington battles Nightcrawler once more until the former is knocked unconscious by a crashing airplane.

 Video games 
 Warren Worthington III as Archangel appears as an assist character in X-Men.
 Warren Worthington III as Archangel appears as a playable character in the X-Men II: The Fall of the Mutants.
 Warren Worthington III as Archangel appears in Chun-Li's ending in X-Men vs. Street Fighter.
 André Sogliuzzo is credited as Angel in X-Men Legends, but the character does not appear in the game. Despite this, the character's model files and icons exist in the game's assets.
 Warren Worthington III as Angel and Archangel appears in X-Men Legends II: Rise of Apocalypse, voiced by Dave Wittenberg. He initially serves as a scout for the X-Men until Apocalypse captures him and tasks Mister Sinister with turning him into Archangel.
 Warren Worthington III as Angel appears in Magneto's ending in Marvel vs. Capcom 3: Fate of Two Worlds.
 Warren Worthington III as Archangel appears in Deadpool's ending in Ultimate Marvel vs. Capcom 3. This version is a member of X-Force.
 Warren Worthington III as Angel and Archangel appears as separate playable characters in Marvel Super Hero Squad Online, voiced by Antony Del Rio and Chris Cox respectively.
 Warren Worthington III as Angel appears as a playable character in Marvel: Avengers Alliance.
 Warren Worthington III as Archangel appears as a playable character in Lego Marvel Super Heroes, voiced by Will Friedle.
 Warren Worthington III as Angel and Archangel appear as non-playable characters (NPCs) in Marvel Heroes.
 Warren Worthington III as Archangel appears as a playable character in Marvel Contest of Champions.
 Warren Worthington III as Angel appears as playable character in Marvel Future Fight.
 Warren Worthington III as Angel and Archangel appear as playable characters in Marvel Puzzle Quest.
 Warren Worthington III as Angel appears as a playable character in Marvel Super War.
 Warren Worthington III as Angel appears in Marvel Snap.

 Books 
 Warren Worthington III as Archangel appears in Planet X. After being infected by the Borg's techno-organic virus, he helps Dr. Beverly Crusher program a copy of Professor X into the holodeck and assists Captain Jean-Luc Picard in disarming a bomb that had been launched at a planet the X-Men and Picard's crew are trying to save.
 Warren Worthington III as Archangel appears in the Mutant Empire trilogy.
 Warren Worthington III appears in The Ultimate X-Men story "On The Air", by Glenn Hauman.
 Warren Worthington III as Angel appears in the novelization of X-Men: The Last Stand''. He joins forces with the X-Men to protect Alcatraz Island from the Brotherhood of Mutants.

Collected editions

References

External links 
 Angel at Marvel.com
 Marvel 1602 Angel at Marvel.com
 Ultimate Angel at Marvel.com
 UncannyXmen.net's Spotlight on Archangel
 The Angel (Marvel Comics, 1963) at Don Markstein's Toonopedia. *Archived from the original on April 4, 2012.

Angels in popular culture
Characters created by Jack Kirby
Characters created by Stan Lee
Comics characters introduced in 1963
Fictional activists
Fictional amputees
Fictional businesspeople
Fictional characters from New York City
Fictional characters with healing abilities
Marvel Comics American superheroes
Marvel Comics characters with accelerated healing
Marvel Comics characters with superhuman strength
Marvel Comics film characters
Marvel Comics male superheroes
Marvel Comics mutants
Vigilante characters in comics
X-Factor (comics)
X-Men members